Natacha Polony (born 15 April 1975) is a French journalist and essayist. She worked on the France 2 TV show On n'est pas couché, presented by Laurent Ruquier from 2011 until 2014.

Bibliography 
 Nos Enfants gâchés : petit traité sur la fracture générationnelle, Éditions Jean-Claude Lattès, 2005.
 M(me) le président, si vous osiez... : 15 mesures pour sauver l’école, Éditions Mille et une nuits, 2007.
 L’Homme est l'avenir de la femme, Éditions Jean-Claude Lattès, 2008.
 Préface à Autopsie du mammouth de Claire Mazeron, Éditions Jean-Claude Gawsewitch, 2010.
 École : le pire est de plus en plus sûr, Éditions Mille et une nuits, 2011.
 Ce pays qu’on abat. Chroniques 2009-2014, Plon, 2014.
 Nous sommes la France, Plon, 2015.
 Chrétiens français ou français chrétiens (with Fabrice Hadjadj and Paul Préaux), Salvator, 2017.
 Changer la vie : pour une reconquête démocratique, Éditions de l'Observatoire, 2017.

External links 
  Éloge de la transmission, her blog about education on Le Figaro website.

References 

Journalists from Paris
1975 births
Living people
French essayists
French people of Polish descent
French television journalists
21st-century French journalists
Le Figaro people